Saints Peter and Paul Melkite Catholic Church is a Melkite Greek Catholic Church in Ottawa, Ontario, Canada. It is located on 1161 North River Road in Overbrook, just to the east of the Rideau River.

History
One of ten Melkite parishes in Canada, the church is largely made up of immigrants from Lebanon, many of whom  arrived in the 1970s and 1980s to flee the Lebanese Civil War. Ottawa  had a small Melkite Greek Catholic community since the nineteenth century, but they had no church until St. Peter and Paul was founded in 1959. The church first met in the basement of Notre-Dame Cathedral Basilica. In 1961 it purchased the building of Our Lady of the Presentation. In 1979 this building was demolished and the current one was built in its place 1978–1980.

About 500-700 people go to this church. But only about 300-400 people go every week. The average age of the people that go to this church is about 50.

Plaque
"O Lord, bless those who love the beauty of your house. For the glory of God and the extension of his kingdom this church was built during the reign of the Most Reverend Joseph-Aurele Plourde Archbishop of Ottawa and the pastorate of Economod Habib Kwaiter, B.S.O. through the generosity of the parishioners and benefactors of Saints Peter & Paul Melkite Catholic Church Ottawa. 1980"

External links
 Official site

References

Churches in Ottawa
Lebanese-Canadian culture
Melkite Greek Catholic churches in Canada
Churches completed in 1980
1980 establishments in Ontario
20th-century churches in Canada